2-Heptanone, also known as methyl n-amyl ketone, or Heptan-2-one, is a ketone with the molecular formula C7H14O.  It is a colorless, water-like liquid with a banana-like, fruity odor. 2-Heptanone has a neutral formal charge, and is only slightly soluble in water.

2-Heptanone is listed by the FDA as a "food additive permitted for direct addition to food for human consumption" (21 CFR 172.515), and it occurs naturally in certain foods (e.g., beer, white bread, butter, various cheeses and potato chips).

The mechanism of action of 2-heptanone as a pheromone at odorant receptors in rodents has been investigated. 2-Heptanone is present in the urine of stressed rats and believe that it is used as a means to alert other rats. Certain species of worms are attracted to 2-heptanone and bacteria can use this as a means of pathogenesis. 2-Heptanone has also been found to be excreted by honey bees when they bite small pests within the colony such as wax moth larvae and Varroa mites. Though it was historically believed to be an alarm pheromone, 2-heptanone has been shown to act as an anaesthetic on the pests, enabling the honey bee to stun the pest and eject it from the hive.  The work could lead to the use of 2-heptanone as an alternative local anaesthetic to lidocaine, which although well established for clinical use, has the disadvantage of provoking allergic reactions in some people.

2-Heptanone was one of the metabolites of n-heptane found in the urine of employees exposed to heptane in shoe and tire factories. This commonly occurs from exposure to plasticisers.  2-Heptanone can be absorbed through the skin, inhaled and consumed. Exposure to 2-Heptanone can cause irritation of skin/eyes, respiratory system, headaches, vomiting, and nausea.

In mice 2-H is a urinary component and pheromone. It has a high affinity for the main olfactory epithelium. Gaillard et al 2002 found that it agonizes one specific olfactory receptor, and that that OR only binds 2-H.

References

External links 
 MSDS for 2-heptanone
 Methyl (n-amyl) ketone, NIOSH Pocket Guide to Chemical Hazards

Heptanones